The 2014 British Superbike Championship season was the 27th British Superbike Championship season. Shane Byrne took the championship, riding a Kawasaki for Paul Bird Motorsport. Byrne's fourth title – after previous triumphs in 2003, 2008 and 2012 – saw him set a new record for the series. He scored 11 victories during the season, and was able to win the championship by 62 points ahead of Ryuichi Kiyonari, a three-time series champion. Kiyonari had trailed by 12 points going into the final round of the season at Brands Hatch, but Kiyonari crashed out of contention during a free practice session, and fractured a collarbone in the process. Kiyonari won seven races during the season for the Buildbase BMW team. Third place in the championship was decided in the final race between Milwaukee Yamaha team-mates; a third-place finish for Tommy Bridewell, compared to a fifth place for Josh Brookes, allowed Bridewell to take the position by three points. Brookes took four race victories to his team-mate's single victory at Cadwell Park, which was his first in British Superbikes.

Outside of the Showdown, Stuart Easton was the winner of the BSB Riders' Cup, finishing in seventh place in the overall championship standings. Although only recording two podium finishes during the season, consistent finishing allowed Easton to remain in front of the chasing pack, most notably GBmoto's James Ellison. Ellison started the season with six successive podium finishes and had been in contention to make the Showdown, but he was forced to miss several rounds after a crash at the second Brands Hatch meeting which resulted in a broken femur. The only other riders to win races during the season were three more first-time winners in the series; Tyco Suzuki rider Josh Waters won at the second Brands Hatch meeting, Peter Hickman won at Cadwell Park for the RAF Reserves team – having replaced Simon Andrews in the team, after his death at the North West 200 road race in May – and Quattro Plant Kawasaki's Howie Mainwaring won the opening race of the final Brands Hatch meeting.

Kawasaki won the manufacturers' championship, 124 points clear of Yamaha. Byrne, Kiyonari and Brookes all scored seven points towards the Speedy Fastest Lap League, with all three riders each setting a lap record at some point during the 2014 campaign.

To increase the emphasis of a main season win, the playoff bonus points was changed to five points for a win (up from three), three points for second (up from two), and one point for third.

Race calendar and results

Entry list

Championship standings

Riders' championship

Notes

External links

British Superbike Championship
Superbike Championship
British